Ethan Bear (born June 26, 1997) is an Cree professional ice hockey defenceman for the Vancouver Canucks of the National Hockey League (NHL). He was drafted in the fifth round, 124th overall, by the Edmonton Oilers in the 2015 NHL Entry Draft.

Playing career
He was drafted in the fifth round in the 2015 NHL Entry Draft by the Edmonton Oilers from the Seattle Thunderbirds in the Western Hockey League (WHL). He was signed to a three-year, entry-level contract with the Oilers on July 2, 2016. Bear made his NHL debut on March 1, 2018, in a game against the Nashville Predators. He recorded his first NHL goal in a 5–4 overtime loss to the Anaheim Ducks on March 25, 2018.

Bear was the first player to wear a jersey with his name written in Cree syllabics (Maskwa) during an exhibition match against the Calgary Flames on July 28, 2020.

On December 28, 2020, Bear signed a two-year, $4 million contract extension with the Oilers.

After his fourth year within the Oilers organization, Bear was traded to the Carolina Hurricanes in exchange for Warren Foegele on July 28, 2021. In the following 2021–22 season, Bear tied a career high with five goals and added nine assists for 14 points through 58 regular season games. Struggling to fully adjust to the Hurricanes system, Bear was a healthy scratch through two rounds of the playoffs.

As a restricted free agent in the off-season, Bear was re-signed by the Hurricanes to a one-year, $2.2 million contract on July 28, 2022. Beginning the 2022–23 season as a healthy scratch, Bear was traded by the Hurricanes alongside Lane Pederson to the Vancouver Canucks in exchange for a fifth-round pick in 2023.

Personal life
Bear was born in Regina, Saskatchewan and raised in the Ochapowace Nation near Whitewood, Saskatchewan. His older brother, Everett, also played hockey. He is of Cree descent. He faced racism from hockey fans relying on stereotypes for being a "lazy" player while growing up, which motivated him to work harder as he drew inspiration from his brother and other Indigenous hockey players, including Carey Price, Jordin Tootoo, Brandon Montour, Arron Asham and Micheal Ferland. In the summer, he gives back by running a youth hockey camp in Ochapowace.

Career statistics

Regular season and playoffs

International

Awards and honours

References

External links
 

1997 births
Living people
Bakersfield Condors players
Canadian ice hockey defencemen
Carolina Hurricanes players
Cree people
Edmonton Oilers draft picks
Edmonton Oilers players
First Nations sportspeople
Ice hockey people from Saskatchewan
People from Whitewood, Saskatchewan
Seattle Thunderbirds players
Sportspeople from Regina, Saskatchewan
Vancouver Canucks players